Gabal Hagar El Zarqa is the highest point in Bir Tawil, an unclaimed area in the Nubian desert between Egypt and Sudan in Northeast Africa. Due to a long-standing disagreement over the location of that border, its jurisdiction is unclear; it is said by the National Geospatial-Intelligence Agency to be in Egypt.

See also
 Al Hajar Mountains
 North Africa
 Wildlife of Egypt
 Wildlife of Sudan

References

Hagar ez Zarqa